Erigonops is a monotypic genus of African dwarf spiders containing the single species, Erigonops littoralis. It was first described by N. Scharff in 1990, and has only been found in South Africa.

See also
 List of Linyphiidae species (A–H)

References

Endemic fauna of South Africa
Linyphiidae
Monotypic Araneomorphae genera
Spiders of South Africa